China sent 7 competitors to compete in one discipline at the 2010 Winter Paralympics in Vancouver, British Columbia, Canada.

Cross-country skiing 

Women

Men

See also
China at the 2010 Winter Olympics

References

External links
Vancouver 2010 Paralympic Games official website
International Paralympic Committee official website

Nations at the 2010 Winter Paralympics
2010
2010 in Chinese sport